Oswego is an unincorporated community in Plain Township, Kosciusko County, in the U.S. state of Indiana.

History
Oswego was laid out in 1837. It was named after Oswego, New York. A post office was established at Oswego in 1840, and remained in operation until it was discontinued in 1935.

Geography

References

Unincorporated communities in Kosciusko County, Indiana
Unincorporated communities in Indiana